My Week with Marilyn is a 2011 British drama film directed by Simon Curtis and written by Adrian Hodges. The screenplay was adapted from two diary accounts by Colin Clark, which document his time on the set of the 1957 film The Prince and the Showgirl and the time he spent with Marilyn Monroe. Michelle Williams and Eddie Redmayne star as Monroe and Clark, respectively. My Week with Marilyn had its world premiere at the 49th New York Film Festival on 9 October 2011. The film then played at several film festivals including Mill Valley, Chicago and Philadelphia, Rome and Dubai. My Week with Marilyn was released on 23 November 2011 in the United States and two days later in the United Kingdom. As of May 2012, the film has earned over £20 million in its total worldwide gross at the box office.

The film has gathered various awards and nominations following its release, with most nominations recognising the film itself and the cast's acting performances, particularly those of Michelle Williams and Kenneth Branagh (who plays Laurence Olivier). Both actors received nominations at the 84th Academy Awards for Best Actress and Best Supporting Actor, respectively. The actors also received nominations from the Alliance of Women Film Journalists, while the film was nominated for Best Picture at the African-American Film Critics Association. My Week with Marilyn received four nominations from the Broadcast Film Critics Association, with two nominations coming in the Best Costume Design and Best Makeup categories. The British Academy Film Awards handed the film seven nominations, including Best British Film, Best Actress for Williams, Best Actress in a Supporting Role for Judi Dench, Best Costume Design and Best Makeup and Hair. The cast received the Capri Ensemble Cast Award from the Capri, Hollywood International Film Festival in January 2012.

Williams won the Chicago Film Critics Association Award for Best Actress, while Curtis earned a nomination for Most Promising Filmmaker. My Week with Marilyn and Branagh garnered nominations from the 69th Golden Globe Awards, while Williams won Best Actress in a Comedy or Musical Motion Picture. The actress also earned the Best Actress award from the Hollywood Film Festival. The London Film Critics' Circle awarded Kenneth Branagh the Supporting Actor of the Year accolade. Both Williams and Branagh gathered nominations at the Satellite Awards and the Screen Actors Guild Awards ceremonies. The Toronto Film Critics Association awarded Williams for her portrayal of Monroe. The film's casting crew, Deborah Aquila, Tricia Wood and Nina Gold earned a nomination for Outstanding Achievement in Casting – Feature – Studio or Independent Drama from the Casting Society of America.

Awards and nominations

References
General

 

Specific

External links
 

Lists of accolades by film